In China the Secretary General of the Central Commission for Discipline Inspection ( or  for short) of the Chinese Communist Party is responsible for administrative management of the CCDI.

Executive Secretary of the Central Commission for Discipline Inspection (1978–1987)

Secretary General of the Central Commission for Discipline Inspection (1987–present)

Notes

Central Commission for Discipline Inspection